The 1987 Indianapolis Colts season was the 35th season for the team in the National Football League (NFL) and fourth in Indianapolis. It was also their first full season under head coach Ron Meyer, who had taken over an 0-13 Colts team the previous season after Rod Dowhower was fired. 

The team finished the strike-shortened season with a record of 9-6 and won the AFC East division.

This season marked the first winning season, division championship, and the first trip to the playoffs for the Colts in Indianapolis. It was the franchise's first playoff appearance in ten seasons.

NFL Films produced a documentary about the team's season entitled Off and Running; it was narrated by Jeff Kaye.

Offseason

NFL draft

NFL replacement players 
After the league decided to use replacement players during the NFLPA strike, the following team was assembled:

Roster

Pre season

Schedule

Preseason Game summaries

Week P1 (Saturday, August 15, 1987): at Detroit Lions 

Point spread: 
 Over/Under: 
 Time of Game:

Week P2 (Saturday, August 22, 1987): at Minnesota Vikings 

Point spread: 
 Over/Under: 
 Time of Game:

Week P3 (Saturday, August 29, 1987): vs. Houston Oilers 

Point spread: 
 Over/Under: 
 Time of Game:

Week P4 (Saturday, September 5, 1987): vs. Tampa Bay Buccaneers 

Point spread: 
 Over/Under: 
 Time of Game: 3 hours, 19 minutes

Regular season 
On October 31, 1987, the Los Angeles Rams traded Eric Dickerson to the Indianapolis Colts in a three team trade involving the Buffalo Bills. The Rams sent Dickerson to the Colts for six draft choices and two players. Buffalo obtained the rights to Cornelius Bennett from Indianapolis. Buffalo sent running back Greg Bell and three draft choices to the Rams, while Indianapolis added Owen Gill and three of their own draft picks to complete the deal with the Rams.

Schedule

Regular Season Game summaries

Week 1 (Sunday, September 13, 1987): vs. Cincinnati Bengals 

Point spread: Colts +5½
 Over/Under: 44.0 (push)
 Time of Game: 2 hours, 48 minutes

Week 2 (Sunday, September 20, 1987): vs. Miami Dolphins 

Point spread: Colts +5
 Over/Under: 46.5 (under)
 Time of Game: 3 hours, 0 minutes

Week 3 (Sunday, September 27, 1987): at St. Louis Cardinals 
Cancelled due to player's strike.

Week 4 (Sunday, October 4, 1987): at Buffalo Bills 

Point spread: Colts –3.5
 Over/Under: 
 Time of Game:

This game was played with replacement players.

Week 5 (Sunday, October 11, 1987): vs. New York Jets 

Point spread: Colts –11
 Over/Under: 
 Time of Game:

This game was played with replacement players.

Week 6 (Sunday, October 18, 1987): at Pittsburgh Steelers 

Point spread: Colts +11½
 Over/Under: 
 Time of Game:

This game was played with replacement players.

Week 7 (Sunday, October 25, 1987): vs. New England Patriots 

Point spread: Colts +6½
 Over/Under: 44.0 (over)
 Time of Game: 3 hours, 8 minutes

Week 8 (Sunday, November 1, 1987): at New York Jets 

Point spread: Colts +7
 Over/Under: 44.0 (under)
 Time of Game: 2 hours, 50 minutes

 Eric Dickerson's first game with Colts

Week 9 (Sunday, November 8, 1987): vs. San Diego Chargers 

Point spread: Colts Pick'em
 Over/Under: 45.0 (under)
 Time of Game: 2 hours, 57 minutes

Week 10 (Sunday, November 15, 1987): at Miami Dolphins 

Point spread: Colts +7
 Over/Under: 46.0 (over)
 Time of Game: 3 hours, 23 minutes

Week 11 (Sunday, November 22, 1987): at New England Patriots 

Point spread: Colts +1
 Over/Under: 39.0 (under)
 Time of Game: 3 hours, 5 minutes

Week 12 (Sunday, November 29, 1987): vs. Houston Oilers 

Point spread: Colts –3½
 Over/Under: 42.0 (over)
 Time of Game: 3 hours, 30 minutes

Week 13 (Sunday, December 6, 1987): at Cleveland Browns 

Point spread: Colts +8
 Over/Under: 42.0 (under)
 Time of Game: 2 hours, 56 minutes

Week 14 (Sunday, December 13, 1987): vs. Buffalo Bills 

Point spread: Colts –3½
 Over/Under: 44.5 (under)
 Time of Game: 3 hours, 12 minutes

Week 15 (Sunday, December 20, 1987): at San Diego Chargers 

Point spread: Colts +3½
 Over/Under: 42.0 (under)
 Time of Game: 3 hours, 8 minutes

Week 16 (Sunday, December 27, 1987): vs. Tampa Bay Buccaneers 

Point spread: 
 Over/Under: 
 Time of Game: 3 hours, 18 minutes

Standings

Stats 

Passing

Rushing

Receiving

Kicking

Punting

Kick Return

Punt Return

Sacks

Interceptions

Fumbles

Tackles

Scoring Summary

Team

Quarter-by-quarter

Playoffs 

The team received a bye for the Wild-Card round of the playoffs and traveled to Cleveland for the Divisional round. After being tied with Browns for most of the game the 4th quarter proved to be their undoing, as they were outscored 17–7.

Playoff Game summaries

AFC Wild Card Playoffs: First-round bye

AFC Divisional Playoffs (Saturday, January 9, 1988): at (A2) Cleveland Browns 

Point spread: 
 Over/Under: 
 Time of Game: 3 hours, 15 minutes

References

See also 
 History of the Indianapolis Colts
 List of Indianapolis Colts seasons
 Colts–Patriots rivalry

Indianapolis Colts
AFC East championship seasons
Indianapolis Colts seasons
Indianapolis Colts